Mawat is a village and subdistrict in Sulaymaniyah Governorate in the Kurdistan Region, Iraq. It is located in Mawat District.

References

Populated places in Sulaymaniyah Province
Kurdish settlements in Iraq
Subdistricts of Iraq